Die Cathedral is a Roman Catholic church located in Die, Drôme, France. The former cathedral is a national monument.

Die Cathedral was previously the seat of the Bishop of Die. The diocese was not re-established after the French Revolution, but was annexed to the Diocese of Grenoble following the Concordat of 1801.

External links

Location

Former cathedrals in France
Churches in Drôme